Theme Park Inc. (known as SimCoaster in the United States and Australia and Theme Park Manager in Germany) is a construction and management simulation video game. It is the sequel to Theme Park World (1999). Theme Park Inc. was developed by Bullfrog Productions and published by Electronic Arts. It was the last game to bear the Bullfrog logo before the company's merger with EA UK in 2004.

Gameplay

The player starts out as the assistant manager of a theme park, hired by the president of the company to take over his position. To do this, the player must build and manage a theme park with three unique zones: Land of Invention, Polar Zone, and Arabian Nights. Each zone has unique rides, sideshows and scenery items. The player is guided by the president and his directors (each of whom specialize in a specific area of park management), and is aided by a blue spherical creature, named the Advisor, who gives the player advice. The player must hire staff to maintain the park, keep guests happy, and research new items for the player to build. Staff members must be kept well-rested and happy, or they may go on strike. To advance further into the game, the player must complete several objectives. These objectives involve training staff for a specific job to unlock a new section of the park zone, or completing challenges to gain golden tickets, which are required to beat those objectives. Challenges include keeping guest happiness levels high, making sure a ride does not break down, or making a certain amount of profit from a specific ride. Completing these challenges will give a specified number of golden tickets, and certain challenges must be completed to complete an objective. However, if the player fails too many challenges, they will be fired and the game will be over. The objective of the game is to become the new boss of Theme park Inc by accruing a majority stake in the company and several park awards (e.g., the highest or fastest roller coaster, the fastest go kart, the longest log flume ride, the best security, the best decoration and the best staff training).
Theme Park Inc, in comparison to Theme Park World, has a greater emphasis on the management of the park rather than the rides themselves. The game requires more effort be put into finer aspects such as staff management, park layout, and guests' needs, as not doing so can make it more difficult to complete challenges and objectives. Theme Park Inc also introduced the Roller Coaster Editor, an in-built feature that allows players to create their own layouts for the pylon rides (roller coasters and log flumes) in the game. The players can then save these designs and use them in the game proper.

Reception

In the United States, Theme Park Inc sold 290,000 copies and earned $5.8 million by August 2006, after its release in January 2001. It was the country's 68th best-selling computer game between January 2000 and August 2006. It received a "Silver" sales award from the Entertainment and Leisure Software Publishers Association (ELSPA), indicating sales of at least 100,000 copies in the United Kingdom.

Theme Park Inc received mostly positive reviews. IGN gave the game 8.5/10, stating that the game has a visual charm that similar games, such as RollerCoaster Tycoon, lack. IGN also states that the game is much improved from Theme Park World, in regards to the interface and advisor system. GameSpot gave the game a 6.8/10, criticizing its complicated nature, and stating that the goals interfere with the enjoyment of the game.

Eric Bratcher reviewed the game for Next Generation, rating it four stars out of five, and stated that "like cotton candy dipped in chocolate and then sprinkled with peanuts, SimCoaster takes an established good thing and adds needed substance, though the ingredients don't blend perfectly".

References

External links

2001 video games
Amusement park simulation games
Bullfrog Productions games
Electronic Arts games
Roller coaster games and simulations
Video game sequels
Video games scored by James Hannigan
Video games developed in the United Kingdom
Windows games
Windows-only games
Video games set in amusement parks